Jack Daniel's Racing may refer to these motor racing teams:
 Kelly Racing, International V8 Supercars Championship
 Perkins Engineering, International V8 Supercars Championship
 Richard Childress Racing, NASCAR Sprint Cup

See also
Jack Daniel's